Tiemen Brouwer (18 December 1916, in Ellecom – 18 April 1977, in Leiderdorp) was a Catholic people's party leader and politician.  President of the Catholic Dutch Farmers and Gardeners Association (KNBTB).  He was a representative of the 'green front' faction in the Catholic people's party.  Brouwer was briefly Minister of Agriculture and Fisheries in the cabinet-Den Uyl. Shortly after taking office, he suffered a cerebral hemorrhage.

See also
List of Dutch politicians

1916 births
1977 deaths
20th-century Dutch  economists
Ministers of Agriculture of the Netherlands
Catholic People's Party MEPs
MEPs for the Netherlands 1958–1979
Commanders of the Order of the Netherlands Lion
Officers of the Order of Orange-Nassau
People from Rheden
Radboud University Nijmegen alumni